Aduard is a village in the municipality of Westerkwartier, in the Netherlands. It is located about 8 km northwest of Groningen. The history of Aduard dates back to the foundation in 1192 of the Cistercian Aduard Abbey, where famous early Humanists like Rodolphus Agricola and Wessel Gansfort studied and lectured. The centre of the village is dominated by the so-called Abdijkerk (abbey church), one of the last visible remains of the erstwhile prestigious monastery. It is suggested that this building, currently in use by the Protestant congregation, was originally the monastery's infirmary.

Until 1990, Aduard was a separate municipality.

References

External links
 

Former municipalities of Groningen (province)
Populated places in Groningen (province)
Westerkwartier (municipality)